Ladies Hit Squad may refer to:
 The UK garage crew founded by Wiley, DJ Target and Maxwell D
 "Ladies Hit Squad", a 2016 rap song by Skepta featuring D Double E and ASAP Nast